Charlie White (born 1972 in Philadelphia, Pennsylvania) is an American artist and academic.

White received his BFA in 1994 from the School of Visual Arts in New York City and received his MFA from Art Center College of Design in Pasadena, California, in 1998. He held the position of professor at the Roski School of Art and Design at the University of Southern California in Los Angeles from 2003 to 2016. Since mid-2016 White has held the positions of professor and Head of School at the School of Art at Carnegie Mellon University.

Background

White grew up in Philadelphia, Pennsylvania. He attended Philadelphia High School for the Creative and Performing Arts. While a student at the School of Visual Arts in New York, he worked as an assistant to artists Laurie Simmons and Carroll Dunham and studied with Marilyn Minter.

White moved to Los Angeles in 1996 to attend the Art Center College of Design, where he studied with artists Stephen Prina, Mike Kelley, and Christopher Williams, and received his MFA in 1998. While a student, White created the project Femalien, which was published in CHERI magazine. The magazine was sold at an exhibition at the Andrea Rosen Gallery in November/December of 1996.

Career

White's photographs explore America's social fictions and collective identities. His earlier bodies of work, In a Matter of Days (1999) and Understanding Joshua (2001), were influenced by the highly staged art direction of photographers such as Jeff Wall. In 2003 White exhibited And Jeopardize the Integrity of the Hull (2003), a series of eleven photographs that look at religion, entertainment, privacy, and pop culture.

In 2006 White exhibited "Everything is American", a series of works looking at collective trauma, national anguish, and the tension between what is created in the image and what it was modeled from. Such influences include the Manson Family murders in 1969 and the 1978 Jonestown massacre.

In 2008 White created a body of work titled, Girl Studies, which consists of a 35mm short film titled American Minor, an experimental animation titled OMG BFF LOL, and a series of new photographs. White created and exhibited the series Teen and Transgender Comparative Studies at the 2009 Hammer Biennial curated by Ali Subotnick. The series paired one male-to-female transgender adult with a female teenager doppelgänger and photographed them side-by-side to create a neutral comparison of two simultaneous biological transitions. The pair was photographed in front of a blue grid, a common reoccurring element in many of White's subsequent works. Continuing his work surrounding themes of American teenagers, White finished a series titled Casting Call in 2010. In this body of work, White hosted a casting call for one "California Girl" between the ages of 13 and 16 to appear on a billboard in participation with LAXART. The performance and casting process lasted one day and was open to the public.

In 2011 White was included in the Singapore Biennale, where he exhibited the works "OMG BFF LOL" from Girl Studies as well as "Magazine Covers 2004-2007". In 2012 White exhibited several works at LACMA, including a new animation titled "A life in B Tween", past works such as "Casting Call", and the works from Girl Studies. The exhibition was titled, Sun and Other Stars, and included works by Katy Grannan alongside White. "Music for Sleeping Children" was a collaborative project between White and Bryan Hollon, also in 2012. The result of the collaboration was an album and series of music videos combining music with recorded teen girl monologues.

White's body of work titled "Self Portrait" was created in 2014 and was his first time photographing staged nudes and still lives. The figures and objects are all positioned in front of a single blue grid.

White also contributes writings to journals and publications such as Artforum and Words without Pictures. He is also the editor of The Enemy, a triannual online journal.

Exhibition history
White's work has been featured within the following venues and exhibitions:
 Museum Angewandte Kunst, Frankfurt, Germany, 2015
 MU Art Space, Eindhoven, The Netherlands, 2014
 Spectator Sports, Museum of Contemporary Photography, Chicago, IL, 2013
 De madonna a Madonna: (De)construcciones de lo femenino en la sociedad contemporánea, DA2, Domus Artium, Salamanca, Spain, 2013
 The Sun and Other Stars, Los Angeles County Museum of Art, 2012
 Singapore Biennale, Singapore, 2011
 The Artist's Museum Museum of Contemporary Art, Los Angeles, 2010-2011
 Nine Lives: Visionary Artists from LA, Hammer Biennale, Hammer Museum, Los Angeles, CA, 2009
 OMG BFF LOL, The Aldrich Contemporary Art Museum, Ridgefield, CT, 2009
 Teen and Transgender Comparative Studies, 80WSE, New York University, 2009
 Contemporary Arts Museum Houston, TX, 2008
 The Puppet Show Institute of Contemporary Art, Philadelphia, 2008
 Museum of Contemporary Art Chicago, IL, 2007
 Art in America Now, Museum of Contemporary Art Shanghai, China, 2007
 ZKM Museum, Karlsruhe, Germany, 2007
 Everything is American, Center of Contemporary Art, Salamanca, Spain, 2006
 Oberösterreichische Landesmuseen, Linz, Austria, 2004
 Gertrude Contemporary Art Spaces, Melbourne, Australia, 2003
 Brooklyn Museum of Art, Brooklyn, NY, 2001
 MoMA PS1, New York, NY, 2001
 Yerba Buena Center for the Arts, San Francisco, CA, 2000

White's film American Minor was shown at the 2009 Sundance Film Festival.

Representation 

Charlie White is represented by Loock Gallery in Berlin and Ghebaly Gallery in Los Angeles. From 1999 to 2006, White exhibited with Andrea Rosen in New York.

Publications
About White's work:

 Hysteric Four, 1999, Hysteric Glamour Japan. (limited edition)
 Charlie White Photographs, 2001, Goliath Books, Germany.
 And Jeopardize the Integrity of the Hull, 2003, TDM Paris. (limited edition)
 Charlie White, 2006, DOMUS ARTIUM, Spain. Exhibition Catalog, essays by Jan Tumlir.
 Monsters, 2007, Powerhouse Books. Essay by Sally O'Reilly, with an interview by Benjamin Weismann.
 American Minor, 2009, JRP-Ringier. Essays by Christoph Doswald and Dorothea Strauss.
 Such Appetite, 2013, Little Brown Mushroom. Edited by Alec Soth, St. Paul, MN.

Awards 
 2011 MacDowell Fellow 
 2008 California Community Foundation, Mid-Career Artist's Grant

Music videos
Charlie White created a music video in 2004 for the band Interpol's single "Evil", from the album Antics. He also directed the lead single for the band's 2010 self-titled release, "Lights".

Charlie White took part in the 2006 Adicolor web campaign, which invited young directors to make a short web film based on a color. White selected the color pink and worked with musician Greg Weeks.

References

External links
Official website
Ghebaly Gallery
Loock Gallery
New York Times: a short story by Charlie White
Charlie White 'Music for Sleeping Children'
Interview with Charlie White and Ali Subotnik
Art in America : Interview with Charlie White
CROSSING OVER: CHARLIE WHITE
Charlie White Named Head of the School of Art at Carnegie Mellon

1972 births
Living people
Artists from Philadelphia